No Ceilings 2 is a mixtape by American rapper Lil Wayne, released on November 26, 2015. The mixtape was self-released due to Wayne leaving Cash Money Records. It features guest appearances from Baby E, Curren$y, Euro, Future, Gudda Gudda, Hoodybaby, Jae Millz, King Los, Lucci Lou, Mannie Fresh, Shanell, Stephanie Acevedo, T@, Turk, & Yo Gotti.

Reception 
The mixtape received generally positive reviews from critics. HeyReverb described Wayne's efforts as loose and limber. Going on to say It's hilarious, absurd, outrageous and brilliant. Forbes commented "Despite Label Woes, Lil Wayne Remains The Mixtape Master".

NME gave the mixtape 4/5 and saying "This aint a stop-gap, it's a goddamn arms race. 'No Ceilings 2', Lil Wayne's newest free mixtape, is about more than suppressing fans’ appetites for the New Orleans rapper's much-delayed album 'Tha Carter V', of which there's still no sign. His third release this year, and sequel to 2009's 'No Ceilings', is a reminder of Wayne's prowess, as he outdoes rivals on their own tracks. Robert Christgau gave the album a 3-star honorable mention rating, which corresponds to "an enjoyable effort consumers attuned to its overriding aesthetic or individual vision may well treasure.".

Artists Wiz Khalifa and Erykah Badu have expressed their fondness of the tape on social media.

Track listing

References

Lil Wayne albums
2015 mixtape albums
Self-released albums
Sequel albums